Ceromya is a genus of tachinid flies in the family Tachinidae, containing the following species:

Species

C. amblycera (Aldrich, 1934)
C. americana (Townsend, 1892)
C. amicula Mesnil, 1954
C. apicipunctata (Malloch, 1926)
C. balli O'Hara, 1994
C. bellina Mesnil, 1957
C. bicolor (Meigen, 1824)
C. buccalis (Curran, 1933)
C. capitata Mesnil, 1957
C. cephalotes Mesnil, 1957
C. cibdela (Villeneuve, 1913)
C. cornuta (Aldrich, 1934)
C. cothurnata Tachi & Shima, 2000
C. dorsigera Herting, 1967
C. dubia (Malloch, 1930)
C. femorata Mesnil, 1954
C. fergusoni Bezzi, 1923
C. flava O'Hara, 1994
C. flaviceps (Ratzeburg, 1844)
C. flaviseta (Villeneuve, 1921)
C. glaucescens Tachi & Shima, 2000
C. helvola Tachi & Shima, 2000
C. hirticeps (Malloch, 1930)
C. invalida (Malloch, 1930)
C. kurahashii Tachi & Shima, 2000
C. languidula (Villeneuve, 1913)
C. languidulina Mesnil, 1977
C. latipalpis (Malloch, 1930)
C. lavinia (Curran, 1927)
C. longimana Mesnil, 1957
C. lutea (Townsend, 1927)
C. luteicornis (Curran, 1933)
C. luteola Tachi & Shima, 2000
C. maculipennis (Malloch, 1930)
C. monstrosicornis (Stein, 1924)
C. natalensis (Curran, 1927)
C. norma Malloch, 1929
C. normula (Curran, 1927)
C. occidentalis O'Hara, 1994
C. ontario (Curran, 1933)
C. oriens O'Hara, 1994
C. palloris (Coquillett, 1895)
C. parviseta Malloch, 1930
C. pendleburyi (Malloch, 1930)
C. portentosa Mesnil, 1957
C. prominula Tachi & Shima, 2000
C. pruinosa Shima, 1970
C. punctipennis (Malloch, 1930)
C. punctum (Mesnil, 1953)
C. rotundicornis (Malloch, 1930)
C. silacea (Meigen, 1824)
C. similata Mesnil, 1954
C. subopaca (Aldrich, 1934)
C. unicolor (Aldrich, 1934)
C. valida (Curran, 1927)
C. varichaeta (Curran, 1927)

References

Tachininae
Tachinidae genera
Taxa named by Jean-Baptiste Robineau-Desvoidy